Dan Shermerhorn (born July 15, 1973) is a Canadian ice hockey player. He is currently playing for the Innisfail Eagles of the Chinook Hockey League (Chinook HL).

Shermerhorn attended the University of Maine where he played four seasons (1993 – 1997) of NCAA Division 1 hockey in the Hockey East conference with the Maine Black Bears. In each of his four years, Shermerhorn was named to the Hockey East All-Academic Team.

Shermerhorn began his professional career in the ECHL with the Hampton Roads Admirals, playing 12 games and the playoffs with the club late in the 1996–97 season.

Awards and honors

References

External links

Living people
1973 births
Anaheim Bullfrogs players
Baton Rouge Kingfish players
Canadian ice hockey centres
Corpus Christi Rayz players
Hampton Roads Admirals players
Idaho Steelheads (WCHL) players
Innisfail Eagles players
Las Vegas Thunder players
Maine Black Bears men's ice hockey players
Quebec RadioX players
Ice hockey people from Calgary
Tacoma Sabercats players
Tallahassee Tiger Sharks players
Thetford Assurancia players
Vernon Lakers players